Dr. Chen Tze-chiang, or T. C. Chen, joined the IBM Thomas J. Watson Research Center in 1984. He is currently an IBM Fellow and the Vice President of Science and Technology at Thomas J. Watson Research Center, IBM Research Division in Yorktown Heights, New York.

During the period of Feb. 1999 - Feb. 2003, Dr. Chen was the Director of Advanced Logic/Memory Technology Development at the Semiconductor Research and Development Center, IBM Microelectronics Division in East Fishkill, New York. During the period of 1992–1999, he was the Senior Manager responsible for the 64Mb/256Mb/1Gb DRAM Technology Development in IBM/Siemens/Toshiba DRAM Development Alliance. Before assuming his role as the Project Manager in DRAM Development, he held a variety of managerial assignments in his career at IBM, including Functional Manager of High-Performance BiCMOS Technology, Manufacturing Engineering Manager in the Bipolar VLSI Line, and Manager of Optical Lithography Development at Watson Research Center.

Dr. Chen was born in Taiwan in 1951. He received the B.Sc. and M.S. degrees in physics from National Cheng Kung University, Taiwan, in 1974 and 1976, respectively, and the M.S. and Ph.D. Degrees in electrical engineering from Yale University in 1979 and 1985, respectively. He has published more than 60 papers in technical journals and conferences. His contributions to advanced bipolar technology had a major impact on IBM S/390 mainframe systems. More recently, his contributions to CMOS miniaturization and DRAM devices have had a profound impact on IBM's leadership in CMOS process technology and DRAM manufacturing. Dr. Chen was elected as a Fellow of the Institute of Electrical and Electronics Engineers (IEEE) in 1999 for contributions to silicon bipolar and DRAM technology development. Dr.Chen has been recognized with several IBM Technical Innovation Awards and was named IBM Distinguished Engineer and IBM Fellow in 1996 and 1999, respectively.

Awards and honors
In 2011 he received the IEEE Ernst Weber Managerial Leadership Award

In 2022 he was elected to the Academia Sinica.

References

External links
 T. C. Chen at IBM Research

Fellow Members of the IEEE
American people of Taiwanese descent
Taiwanese computer scientists
Computer hardware researchers
IBM Fellows
National Cheng Kung University alumni
Living people
Year of birth missing (living people)
Members of Academia Sinica